The Star Screen Award for Most Promising Newcomer – Male is chosen by a distinguished panel of judges from the Indian Bollywood film industry and the winners are announced in December.

Winners

See also
 Screen Awards
 Cinema of India

References

Screen Awards
Film awards for male debut actors